Parkers Car Price Guide is a car valuations, reviews and advice website, and is one of the largest of its type in Europe. It was a monthly magazine between March 1972 and January 2020, and since 1998, a website with reviews and price lists for new and used cars in the United Kingdom. Initial searches are free, with payment required to access further details.

It was founded in 1972 and was the longest-running printed price guide available to the general public. It expanded over the years to offer reviews, technical data and marketplace intelligence along with pricing. The portfolio of products has been edited by Keith Adams since 2016.

More recently, the title has moved the majority of resources to its online activities and  shifted its emphasis from being merely a valuations resource to a fully featured research tool for car buyers. The Parkers website has expanded to include cars and vans for sale, new and used car reviews, advice articles, finance and news. Typically, the website attracts around three million users per month, according to Comscore, HitWise and GA data. 

Parkers also offers valuations, reviews and news for commercial vehicles (vans and pickups), and the section is headed by Tom Webster. Since 2008, Parkers has been owned and published by the German company Bauer Media Group.

The current editorial team consists of:
 Editor Keith Adams
 Deputy editor Murray Scullion

With contributions from:
 Head of automotive hub CJ Hubbard
 Vans and pickups editor Tom Webster
 New cars editor Alan-Taylor Jones
 Used cars editor Richard Kilpatrick
 Senior staff writer Tom Wiltshire
 Contributor Jake Groves
 Contributor Mike Humble
 Contributor Cat Dow

Timeline
1972: Launch of the Parker's Car Price Guide. 1st issue: March 1972, priced at 20p
1973: Full colour front page
1997: Emap buys Parker's portfolio from Parker Mead. Last Parker Mead edition of the Price Guide was August 1997
1998: Winter 1998 was the first edition of 'Parker's Car Chooser Magazine' which ran until 2006
1999: parkers.co.uk website launches
2000: Website ABCe audit: 117,432 users
2001: Emap Consumer Media Website and Expanding Brand of the year
2001: Website ABCe audit: 316,621
2002: Parker's Car Price Guide and Parker's Older Car Price Guide (Parkers Plus) merged
2003: Spot colour (red) introduced
2003: The company relocates from London to Peterborough and Steve Rose takes over the editors chair from Nick Barfield
2005: Parker's Car Price Guides goes full colour with the addition of imagery
2005: Website ABCe audit: 539,062 in March of this year
2005: Website ABCe audit: 706,054 unique users and 13 million page impressions
2006: Website ABCe audit: 1,005,658 unique users and 19,971,999 page impressions in March of this year
2006: Summer 2006 - Last edition of Parkers Car Chooser magazine
2008: Bauer Consumer Media acquires Emap's Media Division, including Parker's Car Price Guide
2011: Parker's loses the apostrophe to be rebranded Parkers
2015: Glass's Guide print edition closes, leaving Parkers Car Price Guide as the only printed valuations magazine on the market
2015: Bespoke car finance advice section added with Chris Lloyd heading it up
2016: Keith Adams replaces Kieren Puffett as editor
2017: Parkers Car Price Guides monthly magazine revamped to include road tests, buying guides and more deals-specific content
2020: Parkers Car Price Guide monthly magazine ceases publication to concentrate on the Parkers.co.uk website and further develop its valuations tool

References

External links

Automobile magazines published in the United Kingdom
Bauer Group (UK)
Magazines established in 1972
Magazines disestablished in 2020
Monthly magazines published in the United Kingdom
Online magazines published in the United Kingdom